Brent Haygarth and Christo van Rensburg were defending champions, but van Rensburg did not compete this year. Haygarth teamed up with Greg Van Emburgh and lost in the first round to Patrik Fredriksson and Tom Vanhoudt.

Gustavo Kuerten and Fernando Meligeni won the title by defeating Dave Randall and Jack Waite 6–2, 7–5 in the final.

Seeds

Draw

Draw

References

External links
 Official results archive (ATP)
 Official results archive (ITF)

Doubles
Bologna Outdoor